A Brixham trawler is a type of wooden, deep-sea fishing trawler first built in Brixham in Devon, England, in the 19th century and known for its high speed. The design was copied by boat builders around Britain, and some were sold to fishermen in other countries on the North Sea.

The Brixham trawler was a heavy displacement boat of some 60–80 ft length on the deck, with a long straight keel, a straight vertical stem, usually a fantail stern, and a low freeboard to ease the handling of the nets, though this feature was disguised by high bulwarks.  Brixham trawlers carried a tall gaff rig, often ketch rigged though also simply a large sloop, that was powerful enough to carry them quickly to and from the fishing grounds and to tow large trawls.  Renowned yacht aerodynamicist and sailor C. A. Marchaj commented on the type, "With little area of keel surface, these boats lacked weatherliness as compared with the Quay Punt… Not without reason, fishermen of the north-east coast swore that the forefoot took them to windward."

Brixham once had a fleet of 400 such vessels, whose distinctive red sails were coated with local red ochre for protection. Other fleets were at Lowestoft with 375 trawlers, 450 at Hull, 625 at Great Yarmouth and 840 at Grimsby, with smaller numbers at other places.  Only five remain afloat. One of them, Provident (BM28), took part in the Thames Diamond Jubilee Pageant. In 2020 just two existing Brixham Trawlers are based in Brixham. Both built by J W & A Uphams. Pilgrim (1895) and Vigilance (1928). in 2022, Vigilance received a grant of £2,000 towards her renovation from the Royal Warrant Holders Association charity fund as part of the Queen's Platinum Jublilee awards.

Rescue 

References

External links 

 Register of Brixham trawlers

Trawlers
History of Devon
Brixham
Boat types